Eaubonne is a commune in the Val-d'Oise department, in the northern suburbs of Paris, France.

Population

Twin towns
It is twinned with Matlock, Derbyshire, England; Budenheim, Germany and Vălenii de Munte, Romania.

Transport
Eaubonne is served by Ermont–Eaubonne station which is an interchange station on Paris RER line C, on the Transilien Paris-Nord suburban rail line, and on the Transilien Paris-Saint-Lazare suburban rail line. This station is located at the border between the commune of Eaubonne and the commune of Ermont, on the Ermont side of the border.

Eaubonne is also served by Champ de courses d'Enghien station on the Transilien Paris – Nord suburban rail line. This station is located at the border between the commune of Eaubonne and the commune of Soisy-sous-Montmorency, on the Soisy-sous-Montmorency side of the border.

See also
Communes of the Val-d'Oise department

References

External links

Official website 

Land use (IAURIF) 
Association of Mayors of the Val d'Oise 

Communes of Val-d'Oise